Kolymsky (masculine), Kolymskaya (feminine), or Kolymskoye (neuter) is the name of several rural localities in Russia:
Kolymskoye, Magadan Oblast, a selo in Srednekansky District of Magadan Oblast
Kolymskoye, Sakha Republic, a selo in Khalarchinsky Rural Okrug of Nizhnekolymsky District in the Sakha Republic